Since its inception, the Snow Leopard Conservancy India Trust (SLC-IT) has worked to protect the highly-threatened snow leopard (Uncia uncia), its prey species, and its habitat in India. SLC-IT focuses on promoting community-based solutions to the problems facing the snow leopard throughout its Indian range. The organization pioneered the award-winning Himalayan Homestay Program in 2003. Apart from conservation, the organization also conducts ecological research on the snow leopard, its prey species, which help in guiding the conservation programs.

History 
The Snow Leopard Conservancy India Trust was formed in 2000 as the Indian branch of the Snow Leopard Conservancy. It became an independent Indian organization in 2003.

Community-based Conservation 
Community-based conservation is accorded the highest priority because the organization believes that snow leopard and other wildlife of the Himalayas and other mountainous areas in Asia cannot be conserved without the support of the local people who share resources with the snow leopard and other wildlife on a daily basis.

Therefore, the organization has been working tirelessly at the grassroots level to improve the livelihoods so that members of the local community come on board the conservation wagon. Today, fifteen years after the Himalayan Homestays and other community conservation programs were put in place, people are trying to attract the wild animals close to their villages, which is one of the foremost conservation success stories in India as well as outside.

Environmental Education 

Environmental education through training and awareness is a major component of SLC-IT's conservation model. The conservancy produces educational materials like books, CDs and pamphlets regularly, highlighting the rich biodiversity and conservation issues in Ladakh. The organization partnered with Kalpavriksh, a Pune-based organization, in bringing up the Ri Gyancha (jewels of the mountains), a biodiversity resource kit for Ladakh, which has been appreciated by both children and educators. Using Ri Gyancha and other resource materials, they conduct workshops in schools regularly and take school children on field trips to biodiversity-rich areas to create conservation awareness. Teacher training is also an important part of their education program. More recently they have started educating and training graduate students and adults.

Awards and Recognitions 

 2004 - First Choice Responsible Tourism Award at the World Travel Market
 2005  - Global Vision Award for Community Outreach
 2008 - Finalists in the Geotourism Challenge by National Geographic’s Centre for Sustainable Destinations and Ashoka Changemakers
 2013 - Favorite Responsible Tourism Initiative Award by Outlook Traveller
 2015 - Earth Guardian Award by the Royal Bank of Scotland
 2016 - IRTA-Gold in Best Contribution to Wildlife Conservation
 2016 - IRTA-Overall Winner
 2018 - Carl Zeiss Wildlife Conservation Award
 2018 - TOFTigers Wildlife Tourism Award

References

External links
 SLC-IT official website
 Himalayan Homestays website

Nature conservation organisations based in India
Cat conservation organizations